Cyril Kellett (27 April 1937 – 21 March 1993) was an English professional rugby league footballer who played in the 1950s, 1960s and 1970s, and coached in the 1970s. He played at representative level for Hull XIII (a team composed of players from both Hull FC and Hull Kingston Rovers), and at club level for Willow Park ARLFC (Harewood Avenue, Pontefract), Hull Kingston Rovers and Featherstone Rovers  (Heritage № 480) (captain), as a right-footed toe-end style (rather than round the corner style) goal-kicking , i.e. number 1, and coached at club level for Bradford Northern (A-Team) from 1978.

Background
Cyril Kellett was born in Purston Jaglin, Featherstone, West Riding of Yorkshire, England, he worked at Ackton Hall colliery in Featherstone, and he died aged 55 in Featherstone, West Yorkshire

Playing career

Eastern Division Championship Final appearances
Kellett played  and scored 2-goals in Hull Kingston Rovers' 13–10 victory over Huddersfield in the Eastern Division Championship Final during the 1962–63 season at Headingley Rugby Stadium, Leeds on Saturday 10 November 1962.

Challenge Cup Final appearances
Kellett played  and scored a goal in Hull Kingston Rovers' 5-13 defeat by Widnes in the 1963–64 Challenge Cup Final during the 1963–64 season at Wembley Stadium, London on Saturday 9 May 1964, in front of a crowd of 84,488, and played , and scored a record eight goals (from eight attempts) in a Challenge Cup final in Featherstone Rovers' 33-14 victory over Bradford Northern in the 1973 Challenge Cup Final during the 1972–73 season at Wembley Stadium, London on Saturday 12 May 1973, in front of a crowd of 72,395.

Kellett's record eight goals in a Challenge Cup final, was equalled by Iestyn Harris in Leeds Rhinos' 52-16 victory over London Broncos in the 1999 Challenge Cup Final.

County Cup Final appearances
Kellett played , and scored a goal in Hull Kingston Rovers' 2-12 defeat by Hunslet in the 1962 Yorkshire County Cup Final during the 1962–63 season at Headingley Rugby Stadium, Leeds on Saturday 27 October 1962, played , and was man of the match winning the White Rose Trophy in the 25-12 victory over Featherstone Rovers in the 1966 Yorkshire County Cup Final during the 1966–67 season at Headingley Rugby Stadium, Leeds on Saturday 15 October 1966, played , and scored a goal in the 8-7 victory over Hull F.C. in the 1967 Yorkshire County Cup Final during the 1967–68 season at Headingley Rugby Stadium, Leeds on Saturday 14 October 1967, played , and scored 3-goals in Featherstone Rovers' 9-12 defeat by Hull F.C. in the 1969 Yorkshire County Cup Final during the 1969–70 season at Headingley Rugby Stadium, Leeds on Saturday 20 September 1969, and played , and scored 2-goals in the 7-23 defeat by Leeds in the 1970 Yorkshire County Cup Final during the 1970–71 season at Odsal Stadium, Bradford on Saturday 21 November 1970.

Captain Morgan Trophy final appearance
Kellett played in Featherstone Rovers' 0-4 defeat by Warrington in the Captain Morgan Trophy Final during the 1973-74 season at The Willows, Salford on Saturday 26 January 1974.

Notable tour matches
Kellett played in Hull XIII's 17-6 victory over New Zealand at The Boulevard, Hull during October 1961, in front of a crowd of 12,000.

Career records
Kellett holds Hull Kingston Rovers' "most goals in a career" record with 1192 goals, and "most points in a career" record with 2489 points. He also set Featherstone Rovers' "most goals in a season" record with 139 goals in the 1972–73 season, a figure since extended by Steve Quinn, and subsequently by Jamie Rooney. He is third on Featherstone Rovers' "most goals in a career" record list behind Quinn, and Stuart Dickens. As of 2013, he is third on British rugby league's "most goals in a career" record list behind Neil Fox and Jim Sullivan, and as of 2015, with 3686 points; and is seventh on British rugby league's "most points in a career" record list behind Neil Fox, Jim Sullivan, Kevin Sinfield, Gus Risman, John Woods and Mick Nanyn.

Club career
Kellett made his début for Featherstone Rovers Saturday 20 January 1968, he appears to have scored no drop-goals (or field-goals as they are currently known in Australasia), but prior to the 1974–75 season all goals, whether; conversions, penalties, or drop-goals, scored 2-points, consequently prior to this date drop-goals were often not explicitly documented, therefore '0' drop-goals may indicate drop-goals not recorded, rather than no drop-goals scored.

Honoured at Featherstone Rovers
Cyril Kellett is a Featherstone Rovers Hall of Fame inductee.

Genealogical information
Cyril Kellett's marriage to Joan (née Lucas) was registered during first ¼ 1958 in Hemsworth district. They had children; the future rugby league footballer who played in the 1980s; Brian Kellett (birth registered fourth ¼  in Hemsworth district). Cyril Kellett was the younger brother of Joyce Kellet,  and the older brother of rugby league footballer David Kellett and Sandra Kellett.

References

External links

 Search for "Kellett" at rugbyleagueproject.org
 Photograph 'Cyril Kellett - Cyril Kellett who has been appointed "A" Team coach to replace Maurice bamford who has left for Halifax. - Date: 01/01/1978' at rlhp.co.uk
 Cyril Kellett at marklaspalmas.blogspot.co.uk
Search for "Cyril Kellett" at britishnewspaperarchive.co.uk

1937 births
1993 deaths
English rugby league players
Featherstone Rovers captains
Featherstone Rovers players
Hull Kingston Rovers players
Rugby league fullbacks
Rugby league players from Featherstone